John Lucadello (February 22, 1919 – October 30, 2001) was an American professional baseball player. Primarily a second baseman, he appeared in 239 Major League games for the St. Louis Browns (1938–1941; 1946) and New York Yankees (1947).  The ,  native of Thurber, Texas, threw and batted right-handed. He served in the United States Navy during World War II. He was the brother of longtime MLB scout Tony Lucadello.

Johnny Lucadello's pro career lasted from 1936–1955, with four seasons (1942–1945) missed because of his wartime service. In six Major League seasons, he had 686 at bats, 95 runs scored, 181 hits, 36 doubles, 7 triples, and 5 home runs. He had 60 RBIs, 6 stolen bases, 93 walks, a .264 batting average, a .353 on-base percentage, a .359 slugging percentage, 246 total bases and 5 sacrifice hits.

He died in San Antonio, Texas at the age of 82.

References

External links

1919 births
2001 deaths
Baseball players from Texas
Birmingham Barons players
Decatur Commodores players
Fairbury Jeffs players
Johnstown Johnnies players
Kansas City Blues (baseball) players
Los Angeles Angels (minor league) players
Major League Baseball second basemen
Minneapolis Millers (baseball) players
Newark Bears (IL) players
New York Yankees players
People from Erath County, Texas
Port Arthur Sea Hawks players
Sacramento Solons players
St. Louis Browns players
San Antonio Missions players
Toledo Mud Hens players
Wichita Falls Spudders players
Fostoria Red Birds players